Paulo Alexandre Esteves Teixeira (born 18 November 1980) is a Portuguese former footballer who played as a midfielder. He played 141 matches in the second tier of Portuguese football.

External links

1980 births
Living people
Portuguese footballers
Association football midfielders
Sporting CP footballers
Portimonense S.C. players
C.F. União players
A.D. Ovarense players
C.D. Olivais e Moscavide players
First Professional Football League (Bulgaria) players
OFC Vihren Sandanski players
Portuguese expatriate footballers
Expatriate footballers in Bulgaria
Portuguese expatriate sportspeople in Bulgaria
People from Mirandela
Sportspeople from Bragança District